Sophie Tassignon (born 1980 in Brussels, Belgium) is a Belgian jazz singer, improvisational musician (vocals) and composer based in Berlin since 2008.

Biography 
Tassignon, who spent part of her childhood in Germany, received her first classical piano lessons at the age of four. At the age of six, she won first prize at the Jugend musiziert children and adolescents music competition in Hanover. As a child, she sang in a choir. As a teenager, she also studied drums for five years and trumpet for two years, but returned to piano and vocals. She also wrote songs and experimented with several recordings. She continued her studies in Brussels and attended the German School of Brussels. She then attended the Royal Conservatory of Brussels, where she obtained a master's degree. She also studied jazz piano and took classical singing lessons.

In 2005, Tassignon founded the a cappella project Screaming Bitches with singers Anu Junnonen, Elena Dunkelman and Jacobien Vlasman, who toured European jazz clubs. With the group , she released Zoshia: Moon Talk in 2006. In 2008, she published the album Hufflignon with her husband, Canadian jazz musician and saxophonist, Peter van Huffel, bassist Michael Bates and trombonist Samuel Blaser. With the British electronic musician Sizuzmon Vincent, who introduced her to electro-acoustic music, she formed the electro-acoustic duo Charlotte & Mr. Stone, performing sonic textures and compositions in a live context. The duo first released the album Trees & Birds & Beautiful Things in 2011 on the Vision of Sound label.

In addition, Tassignon has worked for productions by Polish theater director Elzbieta Bednarska. In 2013, with the songwriter, singer and saxophonist Susanne Folk, she founded the group Folk-Tassignon Quartet (from 2015 Azolia), which toured Europe and China and released its first album Dancing on the Rim (Ajazz/NRW Records) in 2014 with bass clarinetist Lothar Ohlmeier and double bassist Andreas Waelti. The group made appearances at the Viersen Jazz Festival and other festivals. His solo album Mysteries Unfold (RareNoise/Cargo) was released in 2020.

Discography 
 2006: Zoshia: Moon Talk (Alone Blue)
 2008: Hufflignon with Peter van Huffel (Clean Feed Records)
 2011: Trees & Birds & Beautiful Things with Sizuzmon Vincent (Vision of Sound)
 2014: Act One: House of Mirrors with Miles Perkin, Peter van Huffel and Julie Sassoon (WismART)
 2017: Azolia: Everybody Knows (Ajazz)
 2020: Mysteries Unfold (RareNoise/Cargo)
 2021: Azolia: Not About Heroes (Jazzwerkstatt Berlin)

References

External links
 Official website
 
 

1980 births
Living people
Belgian jazz singers
Belgian jazz pianists
Belgian jazz composers
Women jazz composers
Women jazz pianists
Musicians from Brussels
21st-century Belgian women singers
21st-century Belgian singers
Royal Conservatory of Brussels alumni
Belgian expatriates in Germany